Ronja Savolainen (born 29 November 1997) is a Finnish ice hockey defenceman and member of the Finnish national ice hockey team, currently playing in the Swedish Women's Hockey League (SDHL) with Luleå HF/MSSK.

Playing career 
As a child, Savolainen played in the youth department of Itä-Helsingin Kiekko (IHK) in her home city of Helsinki, first playing forward before switching to defence in her early teens. At age 14, she played with a high-level boys' team but was nearly driven to quit hockey after being bullied by her teammates because they felt "girls should not play hockey."

During the 2012–13 season, she played junior ice hockey with the men's under-16 team of East Hockey Club (EHC) Red Devil of the U16 Suomi-sarja. She made her senior women's debut with Lohjan Kisa-Veikot (LoKV) of the Naisten Mestis.

The following season, at the age of 16, she began playing in the Naisten SM-sarja with KJT Kerava. The team had an average age of just 19, and its roster featured several future national team players, including Matilda Nilsson, Emmi Rakkolainen, and Noora Tulus. Savolainen scored six points in seven games during her rookie season, adding another thirteen points in eight relegation playoff games to keep the team in the top flight.

She signed with the Espoo Blues, the dominant force in the Nisten SM-sarja, ahead of the 2014–15 season. In her first regular season with the Blues, she scored six goals and 20 assists for 26 points in 25 games and notched two assists in five playoff games. The season culminated with Savolainen's first and the Blues' thirteenth Aurora Borealis Cup victory. She remained with the Blues through the 2015–16 season, posting sixteen points in 26 regular season games.

In 2016, she signed in the Swedish Women's Hockey League with Luleå HF/MSSK in Sweden, joining several other Finnish national team stars on the team.

She began the 2018–19 season with a 16-game goalless streak that was finally broken when she scored a hat-trick against Göteborg HC at the end of November. She finished the season with ten goals and 29 points. After Luleå beat Linköping in the fourth game of the playoff finals, forcing a game five coming back from a 2–0 series deficit, she caused a minor health scare when she celebrated so hard that she fainted on the ice. About the incident, she later shared, "I don't think I've ever been that happy before. It was very nice." Luleå won the decisive game, and Savolainen picked up her second SDHL championship title.

In the 2019–20 SDHL season, she set career bests in goals and points, scoring 20 goals and 41 points, leading all defenders in goals and finishing second among defenders in points. Luleå made it to the championship finals for the third year in a row before the season was canceled due to the COVID-19 pandemic in Sweden. And she was named a finalist for the SDHL Defender of the Year.

During a game against AIK IF in early October 2020, she had to be taken to the hospital emergency ward after her leg was cut by another player's skate. She missed one match due to the injury. In November 2020, along with four other Finnish national team and Luleå teammates, she forced to miss several SDHL games while being quarantined under Finnish law after a national team camp where a player tested positive for COVID-19.

International play 
She made her IIHF World Championship debut at the 2015 IIHF Women's World Championship and has since represented Finland at the World Championships in 2016, 2017.

She scored twice and wasn't issued a single penalty minute, despite averaging over 23 minutes of ice time per game. She scored twice and notched an assist in the semi-final match against Canada, participating in three of the four goals in the historic Finnish victory. After teammate Petra Nieminen’s game-winning goal was controversially overturned, Savolainen was one of five Finnish players to take a shot on American netminder Alex Rigsby Cavallini in the shootout that resulted in the United States' fifth consecutive World Championship gold.

Personal life 
Savolainen was diagnosed with dyslexia and ADHD when she was in primary school. Her ADHD diagnosis was not a surprise to her parents, as her father, Janne, also has ADHD. In March 2020, she chose to speak publicly about her neurodiversity, crediting her girlfriend, Swedish national team player Anna Kjellbin, with encouraging her to be open about her diagnoses.

Along with Finnish national team players Noora Räty and Meeri Räisänen, she has partnered with menstrual cup company Lunette to break the taboo surrounding menstruation in women’s sports. She has worked with Luleå teammate Rebecca Stenberg to create a Youtube channel about daily life in the SDHL.

Savolainen spoke out in support of the 2019 Sweden women's national ice hockey team strike, stating that "it was very brave of every single girl who stood behind it" and that she hoped for Sweden to return to the top IIHF division soon. Her solidarity was criticized by the Swedish Ice Hockey Association's competition director, who suggested she find another league to in which to play.

After a Unionen report, released in January 2020, found that the average top-flight men's hockey player in Sweden earns more than the combined salaries for an entire SDHL team, she stated that "I didn't know [the fucking difference] was so big. It sucks. I'm pissed." After the 2020 IIHF Women's World Championship was canceled due to the COVID-19 pandemic, she was among several Finnish national team players who had to seek a second job since they did not receive the usual stipend for playing in the World Championships.

Career statistics

Regular season and playoffs

International

References

External links
 
 
 

1997 births
Living people
Ice hockey people from Helsinki
Finnish women's ice hockey defencemen
Luleå HF/MSSK players
Espoo Blues Naiset players
Ice hockey players at the 2018 Winter Olympics
Ice hockey players at the 2022 Winter Olympics
Medalists at the 2018 Winter Olympics
Medalists at the 2022 Winter Olympics
Olympic bronze medalists for Finland
Olympic ice hockey players of Finland
Olympic medalists in ice hockey
LGBT ice hockey players
Sportspeople with dyslexia
Swedish-speaking Finns
Finnish expatriate ice hockey players in Sweden
Finnish LGBT sportspeople
LoKV Naiset players